= 2005 Saint Helena constitutional referendum =

25 May 2005
- Should St Helena have a new Constitution which introduces a Ministerial system of government?

Results
Choice	Votes	%
Yes	558	47.29%
No	622	52.71%
Valid votes	1,180	99.83%
Invalid or blank votes	2	0.17%
Total votes	1,182	100.00%
Registered voters/turnout	2,736	43.2%

A constitutional referendum was held in Saint Helena on 25 May 2005. The referendum was ordered by the British government in March 2005, with the proposed new constitution introducing ministerial government. However, it was rejected by 53% of voters.

== Results ==
Should St Helena have a new Constitution which introduces a Ministerial system of government?

Choice	Votes	%
For	558	47.28
Against	622	52.72
Invalid/blank votes	2	–
Total	1,182	100
Registered voters/turnout	2,736	43.20
Source: Direct Democracy
